DLMA analysis (pronounced “dilemma analysis”) is a new business model devised to create insight into where time and energy is being spent within corporations. It consists in a quadrant based matrix which evaluate companies’ performance and is intended to do for organisational design what SWOT analysis does for strategy.

The analysis is based on the assumption that companies consist of four managerial disciplines – directorship, leadership, management and assurance – in competitive tensions between each other. The tool provides a solid framework to analyse the effects of such strain on business performances.

Contents 
The acronym “DLMA” origins from the four systems of thought and action that create a company: directorship, leadership, management, and assurance (also known as corporate governance). Whilst the last three concepts are familiar, directorship represents a new notion which identifies the way boards create value within corporations.

The integrity of a company is determined by the balance of these four management disciplines and their cohesion creates stability within the business and leads to success. However, accordingly to the DLMA argument, the four management disciplines are pulling the scare attention of the company in different directions:

“Think of a company like a forest. While leaders focus on the forest, managers focus on the trees. And while a board in its assurance role is focused on protecting the firm from what is hiding behind the trees, in its directorship role the board is focused on the value that lies beyond the forest”

The matrix 
The DLMA analysis is illustrated through a 2x2 matrix structured on three levels:
 Horizontal. The quadrants above the line are focused on value creation: risk taking, people-centric, about innovation and commercialization. Below the line represents the quadrants that focus on value protection: risk oversight, process-centric, about control and financialization.
 Vertical. The left side of the matrix represents the board perspective, whilst the right side provides the executive role.
 Diagonal. Assurance and leadership represents attitudes that can be practiced throughout the organisation without formal authority; whilst within directorship and management there are positions that demand the acquisition of their authority.

The analysis 
The DLMA analysis is a framing tool aimed to create a simple but complete profile of the company.
It consists in few questions which determine where the company sits in the value creation/value protection matrix. The information is then transformed into the company profile.

The model provides detailed information with regards to the aspirational and present structure of the company and identifies the individual and collective attitude toward it.

References 

 Governance – October/November 2013 Issues 232/233
 Governance – October 2015 Issue 256
 Brunello Menicucci - Menicucci & Co

Business models
Strategic management